John Illingworth may refer to:

 John Illingworth (footballer) (1904–1964), English footballer
 John Illingworth (yacht designer) (1903–1980), English naval engineer
 J. R. Illingworth (John Richardson Illingworth, 1848–1915), British Anglican priest, philosopher, and academic
 Juan Illingworth (John Illingworth, 1786–1853), English admiral